Trachykele blondeli is a species in the family Buprestidae ("metallic wood-boring beetles"), in the order Coleoptera ("beetles"). Common names include "western cedar borer", "powder worm beetle" and "western red cedar borer".
They live in Central America and North America.

References

Further reading
 A catalog and bibliography of the Buprestoidea of America north of Mexico., Nelson et al. 2008. The Coleopterists Society, Special Publication No. 4. 274 pp.
 American Beetles, Volume II: Polyphaga: Scarabaeoidea through Curculionoidea, Arnett, R.H. Jr., M. C. Thomas, P. E. Skelley and J. H. Frank. (eds.). 2002. CRC Press LLC, Boca Raton, Florida.
 American Insects: A Handbook of the Insects of America North of Mexico, Ross H. Arnett. 2000. CRC Press.
 Nelson, Gayle H., George C. Walters Jr., R. Dennis Haines, and Charles L. Bellamy (2008). A Catalog and Bibliography of the Buprestoidea of America North of Mexico. The Coleopterists' Society, Special Publication, no. 4, iv + 274.
 Peterson Field Guides: Beetles, Richard E. White. 1983. Houghton Mifflin Company.
 The world of jewel beetles (Insecta: Coleoptera: Buprestidae), Bellamy C.L.

External links

Buprestidae
Beetles described in 1865